Mohd Fazrul Hazli Bin Mohd Kadri (born 10 July 1989) is a Malaysian footballer who plays for Malaysian club PKNP as a midfielder.

Career
He played in the youth team of Perak, before signing for UPB-MyTeam FC in 2009. UPB-MyTeam disbanded at the end of the season, so Fazrul signed for another club, PLUS FC for the 2010 season. Unfortunately, his new club also pulled out of the Malaysian League at the end of that season due to economic reasons.

He rejoined his old team, Perak for the 2011 season, playing for the team for two seasons. After being released at the end of 2012 season, he joined Sime Darby FC along with four other former Perak players for the 2013 season.

After two seasons with Sime Darby, Fazrul joined ATM FA for the 2015 season. Fazrul Hazli then once again returned to Perak FA for the 2016 Malaysia Super League season.

Honours
 PFAM Asiana.my Player of The Month for July 2016

References

External links
 

1989 births
Living people
Malaysian footballers
Perak F.C. players
Felda United F.C. players
People from Perak
Association football midfielders